Events in the year 1920 in Belgium.

Incumbents
Monarch – Albert I
Prime Minister – Léon Delacroix (to 20 November); Henry Carton de Wiart (from 20 November)

Events

 11 February – Colonial University of Belgium founded.
 11 May – King Albert and Queen Elisabeth attend the London wedding of Oswald Mosley and Lady Cynthia Curzon.
 29 July – World War I veterans storm the Palace of the Nation (Parliament building), demanding the government hear their demands for compensation.
 14 August to 12 September – 1920 Summer Olympics held in Antwerp.
 7 September – Franco-Belgian Accord for mutual defence signed.
 23 October – Ernest Demuyter and Mathieu Labrousse win the 9th Gordon Bennett Cup in Birmingham, Alabama

Publications
 The Yser and the Belgian Coast (Clermont-Ferrand, Michelin)
 André Baillon, Moi quelque part... (Brussels, Soupente)
 George Wharton Edwards, Belgium Old & New (Penn Publishing Company)
 Charlotte Kellogg, Bobbins of Belgium: A Book of Belgian Lace (New York and London, Funk & Wagnalls)
 Charlotte Kellogg, Mercier, the Fighting Cardinal of Belgium (New York and London, D. Appleton and Company)
 A. R. Hope Moncrieff, Belgium Past and Present: The Cockpit of Europe (London, A. & C. Black)
 G. W. Prothero, Question of the Scheldt (London, H.M. Stationery Office)
 Herman Vander Linden, Belgium: The Making of a Nation (Oxford, The Clarendon Press)
 Brand Whitlock, Belgium: A Personal Narrative (New York, D. Appleton)

Art and architecture

Births
 25 January – Jeanne Brabants, dancer (died 2014)
 1 May – Jacques Stiennon, historian (died 2012)
 18 June – Aster Berkhof, writer (died 2020)
 3 July – Eddy Paape, cartoonist (died 2012)
 6 August – Jean de Heinzelin de Braucourt, geologist (died 1998)
 18 August – Marcella Pattyn, Beguine (died 2013)
 5 September – Jean Tordeur, writer (died 2010)
 21 October – Arnold Boghaert, bishop (died 1993)
 12 November – Yvonne Vandekerckhove, swimmer (died 2012)
 11 December – Alfons Van Uytven, trade unionist
 20 December – Helene Moszkiewiez, resister (died 1998)

Deaths
 27 March – Henriette Mayer van den Bergh (born 1838), art collector

References

 
1920s in Belgium
Belgium
Years of the 20th century in Belgium
Belgium